Billie J. Farrell (born ) is an officer in the United States Navy.

Personal life
She graduated from the United States Naval Academy in 2004 with a Bachelor of Science in political science, and has a 2009 Master of Science in operations management from the University of Arkansas. , Farrell and her husband, fellow naval officer Paul Farrell, lived in Charlestown, Boston with their two children aged six and three.

US Navy

Farrell's first Navy assignment was aboard , first as electrical officer and then as navigator. Following her return to the US Naval Academy as the deputy director for professional development, Farrell was assigned to the Commander, Naval Surface Forces Atlantic as the deputy N3.

, Farrell had received two Meritorious Service Medals, four Navy and Marine Corps Commendation Medals, and three Meritorious Unit Commendations.

References

1980s births
21st-century American naval officers
Commanders of the USS Constitution
Living people
People from Paducah, Kentucky
United States Naval Academy alumni
University of Arkansas alumni